William Healey Dall  (August 21, 1845 – March 27, 1927) was an American naturalist, a prominent malacologist, and one of the earliest scientific explorers of interior Alaska. He described many mollusks of the Pacific Northwest of America, and was for many years America's preeminent authority on living and fossil mollusks.

Dall also made substantial contributions to ornithology, zoology, physical and cultural anthropology, oceanography and paleontology. In addition he carried out meteorological observations in Alaska for the Smithsonian Institution.

Biography

Early life
Dall was born in Boston, Massachusetts. His father Charles Henry Appleton Dall, (1816–86), a Unitarian minister, moved in 1855 to India as a missionary. His family however stayed in Massachusetts, where Dall's mother Caroline Wells Healey was a teacher, transcendentalist, reformer, and pioneer feminist.

In 1862, Dall's father, on one of his few brief visits home, brought his son in contact with some naturalists at Harvard University, where he had studied, and in 1863, when Dall graduated from high school, he took a keen interest in mollusks. In 1863 he became a pupil of  Louis Agassiz of Harvard's Museum of Comparative Zoology, in natural science. He encouraged Dall's interest in malacology, a field still in its infancy. He also studied anatomy and medicine under Jeffries Wyman.

First positions, first expeditions

Dall took a job in Chicago. There he met the famous naturalist Robert Kennicott (1835–1866) at the Chicago Academy of Sciences Museum.  In 1865 the Western Union Telegraph Expedition was mounted to find a possible route for a telegraph line between North America and Russia by way of the Bering Sea. Kennicott was selected as the scientist for this expedition, and with the influence of Spencer Fullerton Baird of the Smithsonian Institution, he took Dall as his assistant, because of his expertise in invertebrates and fish. Aboard the clipper Nightingale, under the command of the naturalist Charles Melville Scammon, Dall explored the coast of Siberia, with first several stops in Alaska (still Russian territory at that time). Scammon Bay, Alaska was named after Charles Scammon.

In 1866, Dall continued this expedition to Siberia. On a stop at St. Michael, Alaska, he was informed that Kennicott had died of a heart attack on May 13, 1866, while prospecting a possible telegraph route along the Yukon River. Set on finishing Kennicott's Yukon River work, Dall stayed on the Yukon during the winter. Because of cancellation of his own expedition, he had to continue this work at his own expense until autumn 1868. Meanwhile, in 1867, the U.S. had acquired Alaska from Russia for 7.2 million dollars. This was uncharted country, with a fauna and flora still waiting to be explored and described, a task Dall took upon himself as a surveyor-scientist.

Back at the Smithsonian, he started cataloguing the thousands of specimens he had collected during this expedition. In 1870 he published his account of his pioneering travels in Alaska and Its Resources, describing the Yukon River, the geography and resources of Alaska, and its inhabitants. Also in 1870, Dall was appointed Acting Assistant to the United States Coast Survey (renamed the United States Coast and Geodetic Survey in 1878).

Dall went on several more reconnaissance and survey missions to Alaska between 1871 and 1874. His official mission was to survey the Alaska coast, but he took the opportunity to acquire specimens, which he collected in great numbers. In 1871–72, he surveyed the Aleutian Islands.  In 1874 aboard the U.S. Coast Survey schooner Yukon, he anchored in Lituya Bay, which he compared to Yosemite Valley in California, had it retained its glaciers.

He sent his collection of mollusks, echinoderms, and fossils to Louis Agassiz at Harvard's Museum of Comparative Zoology; plants went to Asa Gray at Harvard; archaeological and ethnological material went to the Smithsonian. In 1877–1878 he was associated with the Blake expeditions", along the east coast of the United States. The major publications on the Blake Expeditions were published in the Bulletin of the Museum of Comparative Zoology Harvard.

Dall was in Europe in August 1878, sent to a meeting in Dublin of the British Association for the Advancement of Science. He took the opportunity to visit mollusk collections and meet European scholars.

1880 and after
Dall married Annette Whitney in 1880. They travelled to Alaska on their honeymoon. After arriving in Sitka, his wife went back home to Washington, D.C. He began his final survey season aboard the schooner Yukon. He was accompanied, among others, by the ichthyologist Tarleton Hoffman Bean (1846–1916).

In 1882 Dall contributed for the Republican Congressional Campaign Committee

In 1884, Dall left the U.S. Coast and Geodetic Survey, having already written over 400 papers. In 1885 he transferred to the newly created U.S. Geological Survey, obtaining a position as paleontologist. He was assigned to the U.S. National Museum as honorary curator of invertebrate paleontology, studying recent and fossil mollusks. He would hold this position until his death.

As part of his work for the U.S. Geological Survey, Dall made trips to study geology and fossils: in the Northwest (1890, 1892, 1895, 1897, 1901, and 1910), in Florida (1891), and Georgia (1893).

In 1899 he and an elite crew of scientists, such as the expert in glaciology John Muir, were members of the Harriman Alaska Expedition, aboard the S.S. George W. Elder, along the glacial fjords of the Alaska Coast, the Aleutian Islands and to the Bering Strait. Many new genera and species were described. Dall was the undisputed expert on Alaska, and the scientists aboard were often surprised by his erudition, both in biology and in respect to the cultures of the  native Alaskan peoples. His contributions to the reports of the Harriman Alaska Expedition, include a chapter Description and Exploration of Alaska, and Volume 13, Land and Fresh-water Mollusks.

He spent two months at the Bishop Museum in Hawaii examining their shell collection.

Societies and honors
He was elected member of most of the U.S. scientific societies, vice-president of American Academy of Arts and Sciences (AAAS) (1882, 1885), a founder of the National Geographic Society, and the Philosophical Society of Washington. In 1897 he was elected to the National Academy of Sciences. He was a Foreign Member of the Geological Society of London.  His eminence also earned him several honorary degrees. Mount Dall, an  peak in the Alaska Range, now in Denali National Park and Preserve, was named after Dall by A.H. Brooks of the U.S. Geological Survey in 1902.

Publications
Dall published over 1,600 papers, reviews, and commentaries. He described 5,427 species, many of them mollusks. Many of his papers were short, but a number of his publications were comprehensive monographs.

 Report on the Mollusca, Part I Bivalvia Bulletin of the Museum of Comparative Zoology Harvard, Vol. XII (1885–1886)
 Report on the Mollusca, Part II Gastropoda & Scaphopoda Bulletin of the Museum of Comparative Zoology Harvard, Vol. XVIII, XXIX – (June 1889)
 On the remains of later prehistoric man obtained from caves in the Catherina Archipelago, Alaska Territory, and especially from the caves of the Aleutian Islands (1878)
 Meteorology and Bibliography of Alaska
 The Currents and Temperatures of Bering Sea and the Adjacent Waters (1882)
 Alaska Coast Pilot (1883)
 List of Marine Mollusca (1884)
 Report on the Mollusca Brachiopoda and Pelecypoda of the Blake Expedition (1886)
 Mollusca of the Southeast Coast of the United States (1890)
 Instructions for Collecting Mollusks (1892)
 Contributions to the Tertiary Fauna of Florida (4 vols., 1890–98)
 Neocene of North America (1892)
 Alaska as it was and Is. 1865–1895 (1895)
 Alaska and Its Resources (1870, 1897)
  Dall, William Healey. "Notes on an original manuscript chart of Bering's expedition of 1725-30, and on an original manuscript chart of his second expedition, together with a summary of a journal of the first expedition, kept by Peter Chaplin, and now first rendered into English from Bergh's Russian version." (4° 2 maps. (Coast and Geodetic Survey. Ann. Report, 1890. App. 19, 759–775.)) See National Geographic  for a related article by Dall.
  Dall, William Healey.Report of geographic and hydrographical explorations on the coast of Alaska [1873.] (4° 1 map. (Coast Survey. Ann. Report, 1873. App. 11, pp. 111–2.))
  Dall, William Healey.  Report on coal and lignite of Alaska. (Geol. Survey. 17 Rpt., pt. 1. 1896. pp. 763–908, pls. 48–58.)
  Dall, William Healey. Report on Mount Saint Elias, Mount Fairweather, and some of the adjacent mountains. (Coast Survey. Ann. Report, 1875. App. 10, pp. 157–88).
  Dall, William Healey. "Tribes of the Extreme Northwest" (Contributions to No. Amer. Ethnology. v. 1, pp. 1–156. ills. 1 map.)
  Dall, William Healey. Map: Showing the distribution of the tribes of Alaska and adjoining territory. 55° to 65° n. lat. × 130° to 170° w. long. Scale 50 stat. m. = 7/8 in. 21⅜ × 30¼ in.

 Genera and species named in his honor 
Brachiopods:
 Dallina Beecher, 1895

Mollusks:
 Conus dalli Stearns, 1873
 Dalliella Cossman, 1895
 Haliotis dalli Henderson, 1915
 Rissoina dalli Bartsch, 1915
 Caecum dalli Bartsch, 1920
 Notoplax dalli Is. & Iw. Taki, 1929
 Knefastia dalli Bartsch, 1944
 Cirsotrema dalli Rehder, 1945
 Hanleya dalli Kaas, 1957
 Propeamussium dalli E.A. Smith, 1886

Crustaceans:
 Chthamalus dalli Pilsbry, 1916

Fish:

 Sebastes dallii C. H. Eigenmann & Beeson, 1894 (Calico Rockfish)
 Lythrypnus dalli (C. H. Gilbert, 1890) (Bluebanded goby)

Mammals: 
Dall's sheep, Ovis dalli Nelson, 1884
Dall's porpoise, Phocoenoides dalli F. True 1885Ursus arctos dalli (Merriam, 1896).

See also
:Category:Taxa named by William Healey Dall

References

 Dall, William Healey. (1870). Alaska and its Resources. Lee and Shepard, Boston.  627 pages. (also reprinted 1897)
Dall, William Healey.  1898. The Yukon Territory: The Narrative of W.H. Dall, Leader of the Expedition to Alaska in 1866–1868. London: Downey & Co.

Further reading
 Boss, Kenneth J., Joseph Rosewater [and] Florence A. Ruhoff. The zoological taxa of William Healey Dall Washington: Smithsonian Institution Press 1968.
 Merriam C.H. "WILLIAM HEALEY DALL" Science. 1927 Apr 8;65(1684):345-347.
 Paul, Harald Alfred Rehder and Beulah E. Shields Bartsch. BIBLIOGRAPHY AND SHORT BIOGRAPHICAL SKETCH OF WILLIAM HEALEY DALL''. Smithsonian Institution 1946.
 

 WOODRING, W.P. WILLIAM HEALEY DALL August 21, 1845—March 27, 1927 a Biographical Memoir  National Academy of Sciences, Washington, 1958. 24 pp.

External links 

 
 
 A selection of Dall's transcribed field books 
 The Harriman Expedition, 1899 at PBS
 
 Juneau Empire article

1845 births
1927 deaths
Explorers of Alaska
Harvard College alumni
Wesleyan University people
American zoologists
American malacologists
Smithsonian Institution people
Teuthologists
United States Geological Survey personnel
United States Coast and Geodetic Survey personnel
American explorers
19th-century explorers
People from Boston
Members of the United States National Academy of Sciences
National Geographic Society founders
English High School of Boston alumni
Conchologists